was a Japanese actor from Kyoto.

He played the role of Sandy in Monkey. Before becoming an actor, Kishibe was a guitarist and vocalist of a Japanese band called The Tigers. He has an elder brother, Ittoku Kishibe, who is also an actor, and a leader and bassist in The Tigers.

In December 2013 he reunited with The Tigers, being wheeled in with a wheelchair by Hitomi Minoru and singing The Beatles song "Yesterday", accompanied by Katsumi Kahashi playing guitar and brother Ittoku Kishibe playing bass. This marked the first time all six Tigers members were onstage together. (Hitomi Minoru did not participate in their 1980s reunion.) 

He died from acute heart failure in August 2020 at the age of 71.

References

External links 
 

1949 births
2020 deaths
Japanese male actors
Japanese male singers
Japanese television personalities
Musicians from Kyoto Prefecture